{{DISPLAYTITLE:C24H34O4}}
The molecular formula C24H34O4 may refer to:

 Algestone acetonide
 Bufalin
 Medroxyprogesterone acetate
 Proligestone
 Testosterone acetate propionate

Molecular formulas